Water is a hamlet in the unparished area of Rawtenstall, in the Rossendale district, in Lancashire, England. Located north of the village of Lumb. It is mostly made of a few homes, farms, a bistro called "The Water Trough", a primary school and industrial estates. In 2020 it had an estimated population of 835.

References

Hamlets in Lancashire
Geography of the Borough of Rossendale